Philip Bradley Buckman (born November 18, 1969) is an American musician and actor. He was the bassist for the rock band Filter from 2010 to 2013, and was the bassist for Fuel from 2015 to 2021.

Early life
Originally from Queens, New York, Phil Buckman arrived in Los Angeles after living in Baltimore and Boston, and attending college in San Diego.

Career

Music
Buckman made a name for himself in the L.A. music scene as the bassist for the band Tribal Sex Cult. Upon the demise of T.S.C., Phil kept busy with a wide variety of projects including Texture (Vital Recordings), Helicopter Helicopter, (Initial Records), FINE (Flip Records), Kill the Complex, and The Snow (Northern Lights) as well as contributing to various film and television soundtracks. Other bands he has been associated with include Onesidezero (Maverick), vOLUMe, THE iMPOSTERS (Interscope), and Go Betty Go (sideonedummy). He is the former bassist for the industrial rock band Filter, the alternative rock band Fuel, the rock band Steel Panther, and is currently the bassist for Petty Cash (Tom Petty/Johnny Cash tribute band).

Acting 
Buckman has an extensive career as a voiceover, television and film actor. As an actor, he had series regular roles on such television shows as Drexell’s Class (FOX), Daddy’s Girls (CBS), City of Angels (CBS), Bob Patterson (ABC), and Boston Public (FOX).
He recently has been seen on the shows Mom (CBS), Schooled (ABC), Broke (CBS), The Resident (FOX), and Secret Lives Of College Escorts (Lifetime).

He was the voice of all television and radio commercials for the Carl's Jr./Hardee's restaurant chains from 2000 to 2011. After a year away from the restaurant's commercials, Buckman was asked to come back, and was the voice of both chains for an additional 5 years. He has also done voiceover work for Yamaha motorcycles and ATVs, the World of Warcraft video game, and countless promos for ABC, CBS, NBC, Adult Swim, and MSG.

Selected filmography 
Broke (2020) as Nick Murray
Marvel Heroes (2013) as Ghost
Boston Public (2004) as Henry Preston
Bob Patterson (2001) as Vic
California Dreams (TV series) (1992) as Sheldon
City of Angels (2000) as Dr. Geoffrey Weiss
Clubland (1999) as Paul
King of the Hill (1999) as Chad
Zoe (1999) as Lonnie
Matters of Consequence (1999) as Joe
An American Werewolf in Paris (1997) as Chris
Beverly Hills, 90210 (1997) as Devin Taggert
A Very Brady Sequel (1996) as Jason
Frasier (1994) as Leo 
Weird Science (1994–1996) as Roger Pizzone
The Great White Hype (1996) as Lee
Daddy's Girls (1994) as Scar
Sister, Sister pilot (TV series) (1994) as Deadhead
Grace Under Fire pilot (TV series) (1993) as babysitter's boyfriend
Wings (1993) as Carter
Drexell's Class (1991–1992) as Slash
Beverly Hills, 90210 (1991) as Surfer Dude
Days of Our Lives (1990) as Larry

References

External links 
 
 
 Official site
 Phil Buckman at Myspace
 ThisIsVolume

1969 births
American male film actors
American rock bass guitarists
American male bass guitarists
Living people
Filter (band) members
20th-century American bass guitarists
20th-century American male musicians